Kabfah Boonmatoon (born March 12, 1987), simply known as Fah, is a Thai retired professional footballer who plays as an attacking midfielder for Thai League 2 club  Ayutthaya United.

International career

In November 2009 he was called up to the Thailand squad for the 2009 Southeast Asian Games.

International

References

External links
 Profile at Goal
https://us.soccerway.com/players/kabfah-boonmatoon/165391/

1987 births
Living people
Kabfah Boonmatoon
Kabfah Boonmatoon
Association football midfielders
Kabfah Boonmatoon
Kabfah Boonmatoon
Kabfah Boonmatoon
Kabfah Boonmatoon
Kabfah Boonmatoon
Kabfah Boonmatoon
Kabfah Boonmatoon
Kabfah Boonmatoon
Footballers at the 2010 Asian Games
Kabfah Boonmatoon
Kabfah Boonmatoon